{{Infobox football club
| clubname = Al-Nassr FC
| image = Logo Al-Nassr.png
| image_size = 180px
| fullname = Al-Nassr Football Club
| nickname =  (The Worldwide)Faris Najd (Knights of Najd)
| founded = |
| ground = Mrsool Park
| capacity = 25,000
| chrtitle = President
| chairman = Musalli Al-Muammar
| captain = Cristiano Ronaldo
| manager = Rudi Garcia
| league = Pro League
| season = 2022–23
| position = Pro League, 2nd of 16
| pattern_la1 = _alnassr2223h
| pattern_b1 = _alnassr2223h
| pattern_ra1 = _alnassr2223h
| pattern_sh1 = _alnassr2223h
| pattern_so1 = 
| leftarm1 = 
| body1 = 
| rightarm1 = 
| shorts1 = 
| socks1 = 0000A0
| pattern_la2 = 
| pattern_b2 =
| pattern_ra2 =
| pattern_sh2 = 
| pattern_so2 =
| leftarm2 = 26466F
| body2 = 23405E
| rightarm2 = 26466F
| shorts2 = 23405E
| socks2 = 23405E
| pattern_la3 = _goldborder
| pattern_b3 = _vneckgold
| pattern_ra3 = _goldborder
| pattern_sh3 = 
| pattern_so3 = 
| body3 = FFFFFF
| leftarm3 = FFFFFF
| rightarm3 = FFFFFF
| shorts3 = FFFFFF
| socks3 = FFFFFF
| current = 2022–23 Al-Nassr FC season
| website = https://alnassr.sa
}}

Al-Nassr Football Club (Naṣr meaning Victory) is a Saudi Arabian football club based in Riyadh. Formed in 1955, the club plays its home games at the Mrsool Park. Their home colours are yellow and blue.

Al-Nassr is one of the most successful clubs in Saudi Arabia, with 28 official trophies. At domestic level, the club has won thirteen Pro League titles, six King's Cups, three Crown Prince's Cups, three Federation Cups, and two Saudi Super Cups. At international level, they have won two GCC Champions Leagues and earned a historic Asian double in 1998 by claiming both the Asian Cup Winners' Cup and the Asian Super Cup. 
The club gained international attention in late 2022 when  Cristiano Ronaldo  signed for the club on a two
and a half year deal receiving €200 million per year (€500 million total).

History

Beginnings and triumphs (1955–1989)
Al-Nassr was established in 1955 by the Al-Ja’ba brothers. Training took place in an old playground at Gashlat Al-Shortah west of Al-Fotah Garden where there was a small football field and a small room to store balls and shirts. In addition to the Al-Ja'ba brothers, Ali and Al-Owais. Prince Abdul Rahman bin Saud Al Saud became the head of Al-Nassr, he spent more than 39 years as the president for 3 stints till his death. His love of the team made him accept the challenge of being the president of a second division club and turning it to a champion and for that reason he is known as [Al-Nassr Godfather] they were promoted to the first division in 1963. During the 1970s and 1980s, the club won four Saudi Premier League titles, six King's Cups, three Crown Prince Cups, and three Federation Cups. The team's success was built around the "Saudi Golden Trio" of Majed Abdullah, Fahd Al-Herafy and Mohaisn Al-Jam'aan.

90s era (1989–2002)
In the 1990s, Al-Nassr won two further Saudi Premier League titles, a King's Cup and a Federation Cup. They also had success in several international tournaments, winning two GCC Champions Leagues, one Asian Cup Winners' Cup and one Asian Super Cup. As a champion of Asian Super Cup, Al-Nassr FC represented the AFC region in the first FIFA Club World Cup in Brazil in 2000. In the competition Al-Nassr played against Sport Club Corinthians Paulista, Real Madrid and Raja Casablanca, and finished 3rd in the group. Al-Nassr won the competition's Fair Play award.

Setbacks (2003–2007)
After the Golden Trio's retirement, Al-Nassr went into some major setbacks. In 2006–07, the club only avoided relegation on the last day of the season, which prompted honorary members of the club to begin an effective long-term plan to revolutionize management and team members.

Recent resurgence (2008–present)
After a major overhaul of playing staff, Al-Nassr went on to win the Federation Cup 2008 against city rivals, Al-Hilal. The club finished third in 2009–10 securing Asian Champions League football for the following season. In 2011–12, Al-Nassr saw itself on the King Cup's final, only to finish as a runners-up, and in 2012–13, Al-Nassr continued its steady steps into returning to the Saudi giant it once was, where it reached the Crown Prince Cup final, only to lose to Al-Hilal on penalties.

In 2013–14, Al-Nassr finally achieved its long-term goal of returning to crowning stages, by earning an impressive double against city rivals Al-Hilal in both league and Crown Prince cups. The team subsequently qualified for the 2015 AFC Champions League following the astonishing accomplishment.

In the 2014–15 season, Al-Nassr continued defending the title as holding champion, by winning the league, and reaching the King's Cup final, as well as qualifying for the Crown Prince's semi-final. The identity of a returning champion still persists within club halls.

In the 2018–19 season, Al-Nassr won the league, as well as making it to the King's Cup semi-finals, and the Asian Champions League quarter-finals.

In both 2020 and 2021, Al-Nassr saw themselves win the Saudi Super Cup in succession, beating Al-Taawoun FC 1–1 (5–4 pen.) in 2020, and beating their fierce city rivals, Al-Hilal, 3–0 in 2021.

On December 30, 2022, Al-Nassr signed Cristiano Ronaldo after the Portuguese player left Manchester United by mutual agreement. Ronaldo’s contract runs for two-and-a-half years until summer 2025, with a total salary of €200 million per year, thought to be the highest ever paid to a professional footballer. He made an immediate impact on the global following of the club, with their Instagram account growing from 860,000 followers before his move to over 10 million followers less than a week later.

Cristiano Ronaldo’s signing into Saudi Arabia’s Al-Nassr national team attracted mixed reactions, especially concerning the exceptions that the Persian Gulf nation was ready to make for the football star. The Portuguese player was in a long-term relationship with his Argentine-born girlfriend, Spanish model Georgina Rodríguez. The form of Islamic law practiced in the Kingdom of Saudi Arabia forbids “cohabitation without a marriage contract”, which the Saudi government apparently agreed to overlook as it pertained to the footballer and his girlfriend. Experts claimed that the country was willing to overlook any legal complications incurred by Ronaldo’s transfer.

Crest and colors

Al-Nassr (Arabic: النصر) is the Arabic word for "victory", clubs with the same name are found in Oman, Kuwait, Bahrain, UAE, and Libya but the Saudi Arabian club was the first to take the name.

The club's logo represents the map of Arabia with yellow and blue colors. Yellow for the sand of the Arabian deserts and blue for the water in the Arabian Sea, the Arabian Gulf and the Red Sea surrounding the Arabian Peninsula. Recently the old logo has been replaced by a "modernised" version, but still is heavily influenced by the old club logo. The new logo only represents the football team while the old logo represents the club as a whole.

 Kit suppliers and shirt sponsors 

PlayersAs of 7 January 2023 Unregistered players 

Out on loan

Personnel

 Current technical staff 

Board members

 Former coaches 

 Ahmed Al-Joker (1960–62)
 Ahmied Abdullah (1962–65)
 Lamaat Qatna (1966–67)
 Abdulmajid Tarnah (1967–69)
 Hassan Sultan (1969–70)
 Zaki Osman (1971)
 Mimi Abdulmajid (1972)
 Hassan Khairi (1973–74)
 Mahmoud Abu Rojeila (1975)
 Vivas (1976)
 Ljubiša Broćić (1976–79)
 Chico Formiga (1980–81)
 Mário Zagallo (1981)
 Francisco Sarno (1983)
 José Chira (1983)
 Carpergiani (1983–84)
 Robert Herbin (1985–86)
 Billy Bingham (1987–88)
 Joel Santana (1988–89)
 Yousef Khamis (1989, 1995, 2000, 2006)
 Claudio Deorati (1990)
 Nasser Al-Johar (1990–91, 1993)
 Dragoslav Šekularac (1992)
 Qadies (1992–93)
 Majed Abdullah (1993)
 Jean Fernandez (1993–94, 1995–96, 1998)
 Henri Michel (1995)
 Ilie Balaci (1996–97)
 Dimitar Penev (1997)
 Dušan Uhrin (1997–98)
 Dutra (1998–99)
 Procópio Cardoso (1999)
 Milan Živadinović (2000)
 Artur Jorge (2000–01, 2006)
 Héctor Núñez (2001)
 Salih Al-Mutlaq (2001)
 Jorge Habegger (2001–02, 2006–07)
 Julio Asad (2002–03, 2007)
 Ljubiša Tumbaković (2003)
 Mircea Rednic (2004)
 Mohsen Saleh (2004)
 Dimitar Dimitrov (2004–05)
 Mariano Barreto (2005–06)
 Khalid Al-Koroni (2006)
 Ednaldo Patrício (2007)
 Foeke Booy (2007)
 Rodion Gačanin (2008)
 Edgardo Bauza (2009)
 Jorge da Silva (2009–10, 2014–15)
 Walter Zenga (2010)
 Dragan Skočić (2011)
 Gustavo Costas (2011)
 Ali Kmeikh (2011)
 Francisco Maturana (2011–12)
 José Daniel Carreño (2012–14, 2018)
 Raúl Caneda (2014, 2016)
 René Higuita (interim) (2015, 2016)
 Fabio Cannavaro (2016)
 Zoran Mamić (2016–17)
 Patrice Carteron (2017)
 Ricardo Gomes (2017)
 Gustavo Quinteros (2017–18)
 Hélder (interim) (2018–19)
 Rui Vitória (2019–20)
 Alen Horvat (2020–21)
 Mano Menezes (2021)
 Pedro Emanuel (2021)
 Miguel Ángel Russo (2021–22)
 Rudi Garcia (2022–)

 Presidential history 

Honours

Al-Nassr have won a combined total of 8  championship  . The club holds various domestic and international records. The club is recognized by FIFA as the first Asian club to play on an international level, as well as the first club in the world to win the FIFA Fair Play Award in the FIFA Club World Cup. On a continental level, Al-Nassr appeared on 4 Asian finals, with two victories, and two times as runners-up.

National titles
Professional League
Winners (9): 1974–75, 1979–80, 1980–81, 1988–89, 1993–94, 1994–95, 2013–14, 2014–15, 2018–19Runners-up (6): 1976–77, 1977–78, 1978–79, 1990–91, 2000–01, 2019–20
King's Cup
Winners (6): 1974, 1976, 1981, 1986, 1987, 1990Runners-up (8): 1967, 1971, 1973, 1989, 2012, 2015, 2016, 2020
Crown Prince's Cup
Winners (3): 1972–73, 1973–74, 2013–14Runners-up (4): 1990–91, 1995–96, 2012–13, 2016–17
Super Cup
Winners (2): 2019, 2020Runners-up (2): 2014, 2015
Federation Cup
Winners (3): 1975–76, 1997–98, 2007–08Runners-up (3): 1993–94, 2000–01, 2008–09

International titles
Asian Cup Winners' Cup
Winners (1): 1997–98Runners-up (1): 1991–92
Asian Super Cup
Winners (1): 1998
AFC Champions LeagueRunners-up (1): 1995
GCC Champions League
Winners (2): 1996, 1997Runners-up (1): 2008

Records and statistics

 League records 

 Asian record 
Overview

Matches

Key: PO – Play-off round; 1R/2R – First/Second round; R16 – Round of 16; QF – Quarter-final; SF – Semi-final;

Notes

Top scorers in Asian competitions

International records
Internationally, Al-Nassr boasts many appearances, both in the Arab world and on the international scale. In 1996 and 1997, Al-Nassr won the GCC Champions League twice in a row, and ran for runners-up in 2008. Al-Nassr appeared in Syria's international tournament, the Damascus International Championship in 2004, and won. Al-Nassr also had successful appearances in Emirati international tournaments, such the Bani Yas International Tournament, winning it two times in 2011 and 2013, as well as winning Al-Wehda International Cup in 2012. Other UAFA participations include a single appearance in the Arab Cup Winners' Cup in the year 2000, as well as the Arab Super Cup in 2001. The club reached finals on both occasions, only to finish course as runners-up, with the two cups going defunct ever since.

2000 FIFA Club World Cup
Winning the Asian Super Cup in 1998 allowed Al-Nassr to participate in the FIFA Club World Cup. In doing so, they became the first team to officially represent Asia in an international tournament, which was held in Brazil from 5 January till 14 January, in the year 2000. The nickname "The International Club''" was obtained following their respective participation in the Club World Cup. Al-Nassr won the FIFA Fair play award following the end of the Club World Cup, and were the first team in the world to win such an award.

Al-Nassr were drawn in Group A along with Corinthians (tournament champion), Real Madrid and Raja Casablanca.

Al-Nassr results

Group A final standings

Participating squad

Notable players
Note: this list includes players that have appeared in at least 100 league games and/or have reached international status.

References

External links

 
fifa.com
the-afc.com
The Saudi Professional League
Saudi Arabia Football Federation
Al-Nassr FC Official English Website
Saudi Arabian football federation
fifa.com

 
Nassr
Nassr
Nassr
Nassr
Nassr
N
N